The West Broadway Bridge, aka West Street Bridge and the Concrete-Metal Bridge, is a vehicular bridge over the Passaic River in Paterson, New Jersey. It carries West Broadway (CR 673), traditionally the Paterson-Hamburg Turnpike, and connects to County Route 509 at its west end.

The bridge was built in 1897 and restored in 2004. The flood of 1903 caused damage or destruction of most bridges in the vicinity of Paterson; the West Street bridge survived with serious damage.

The bridge is considered a nationally significant example of the Melan arch bridge technology and one of earliest and the most important concrete-steel spans in the Northeast.
A historic bridge survey conducted by NJDOT from 1991–1994 determined that the bridge is eligible for listing on the New Jersey Register of Historic Places and the National Register of Historic Places. In March 1997, the State Historic Preservation Office concurred (NJRHP #3959).

See also

 Arch Street Bridge
 Straight Street Bridge
 List of crossings of the Upper Passaic River
 List of crossings of the Lower Passaic River
 List of crossings of the Hackensack River
 List of county routes in Passaic County, New Jersey
 Melan Bridge
 Passaic River Flood Tunnel

References 

Bridges over the Passaic River
Arch bridges in the United States
Bridges completed in 1898
Road bridges in New Jersey
Transportation in Paterson, New Jersey
Buildings and structures in Paterson, New Jersey
Bridges in Passaic County, New Jersey
Concrete bridges in the United States
Steel bridges in the United States